Andy Barlow is a British record producer and musician best known for his work as a founding member of the band Lamb.

Biography
Barlow first found fame as a member of the band Smoll Fat Child with lead guitarist Matt Goldberg.

Later in life, during a hiatus from Lamb, Barlow released solo work as Hip Optimist and LOWB.

His debut album as LOWB, Leap and the Net Will Appear, was re-released by Distiller Records with additional tracks, new artwork and the EP Inward Outburst in 2013.
LOWB performed live on BBC Radio 2's Dermot O'Leary show and at The Great Escape Festival in Brighton.

Barlow has collaborated with and remixed other artists including Damien Rice, Elbow, and Placebo, produced and co-wrote Dismantle and Rebuild with The Ramona Flowers, produced and mixed David Gray's Mutineers and produced five songs on U2's Songs of Experience.

Discography

Hip Optimist

Anafey (BMG. Skint Records, 1996)

LOWB
 Leap and the Net Will Appear (Planet Imports, 2011/Distiller Records, 2013)

Lamb

References

External links 
 Official Lamb website
 Official LOWB website
 LOWB on Google+
 Strata Music (Andy Barlow & Lamb management)

Living people
Year of birth missing (living people)
English record producers
English electronic musicians